Ian Davis may refer to:

 Ian Davis (businessman) (born 1951), British businessman
 Ian Davis (cricketer) (born 1953), former Australian cricketer
 Ian Davis (politician) (1939–2016), former Australian politician
 Ian Davis (software developer), Embedded RDF

See also
 Ian McNaught-Davis (1929–2014), British television presenter
 Ian Davies (disambiguation)